New Zealand's long geological isolation means that most of its flora is unique, with many durable hard woods. There is a wide variety of native trees, adapted to all the various micro-climates in New Zealand. The native bush (forest) ranges from the subtropical kauri forests of the northern North Island, temperate rainforests of the West Coast, the alpine forests of the Southern Alps / Kā Tiritiri o te Moana and Fiordland to the coastal forests of the Abel Tasman National Park and the Catlins.

In the early period of British colonisation, many New Zealand trees were known by names derived from the names of unrelated European trees, but more recently the trend has been to adopt the native Māori language names into English. For a listing in order of Māori name, with species names for most, see the Flora of New Zealand list of vernacular names.

The New Zealand Plant Conservation Network has published a list of New Zealand indigenous vascular plants including all 574 native trees and shrubs. This list also identifies which trees are endemic to New Zealand and which are threatened with extinction.

Species

Pteridophyta (ferns)
Cyatheaceae (a tree fern family)
Ponga or silver fern, Cyathea dealbata
Mamaku Cyathea medullaris
Mountain tree fern Cyathea colensoi
Gully tree fern Cyathea cunninghamii
Soft tree fern Cyathea smithii
Dicksoniaceae (a tree fern family)
Tuakura Dicksonia lanata
Kuripaka or wheki-ponga Dicksonia fibrosa
New Zealand tree fern or wheki, Dicksonia squarrosa

Pinophyta (conifers)
Araucariaceae (kauri family)
Kauri Agathis australis
Podocarpaceae (yellow-wood family)
Kahikatea Dacrycarpus dacrydioides (formerly Podocarpus)
Manoao Lagarostrobos colensoi (syn. Manoao colensoi)
Yellow silver pine Lepidothamnus intermedius
Pygmy pine Lepidothamnus laxifolius
Manoao Halocarpus kirkii
Yellow pine Halocarpus biformis
Bog pine Halocarpus bidwillii
Mataī Prumnopitys taxifolia
Miro Prumnopitys ferruginea
Mountain toatoa Phyllocladus alpinus
Rimu Dacrydium cupressinum
Tanekaha Phyllocladus trichomanoides
Tōtara Podocarpus totara
Hall's tōtara Podocarpus hallii
Needle-leaved tōtara Podocarpus acutifolius
Westland tōtara Podocarpus totara var. waihoensis 
 Mountain totara Podocarpus nivalis
Toatoa Phyllocladus toatoa (formerly Phyllocladus glaucus)
Cupressaceae (cypress family)
Kawaka Libocedrus plumosa
Pahautea Libocedrus bidwillii

Angiosperms (flowering plants)
Akeake Dodonaea viscosa
Beilschmiedia
Taraire Beilschmiedia tarairi
Tawa Beilschmiedia tawa
Coprosmas 
Chatham Islands karamu Coprosma chathamica (Chatham Islands)
Coprosma acutifolia (Kermadec Islands)
Coprosma ciliata
Coprosma dumosa
Coprosma macrocarpa subsp. minor
Coprosma pedicellata
Kanono Coprosma grandifolia
Karamu Coprosma lucida
Large-seeded coprosma Coprosma macrocarpa subsp. macrocarpa
Leafy coprosma Coprosma parviflora
Mamangi Coprosma arborea
Mikimiki Coprosma linariifolia
Taupata Coprosma petiolata (Kermadec Islands)
Taupata Coprosma repens
Stinkwood Coprosma foetidissima
Cabbage trees Cordyline 
Cabbage tree Cordyline australis
Dwarf cabbage tree Cordyline pumilio
Forest cabbage tree Cordyline banksii
Mountain cabbage tree Cordyline indivisa
Three Kings cabbage tree Cordyline obtecta
Dracophyllum (dragon leaf)
Chatham Island grass tree Dracophyllum arboreum (Chatham Islands)
Dracophyllum acerosum
Dracophyllum fiordense
Dracophyllum townsonii
Gumland grass tree Dracophyllum lessonianum
Inaka / Inanga Dracophyllum longifolium
Inanga Dracophyllum filifolium
Mountain neinei Dracophyllum traversii
Neinei Dracophyllum latifolium
Slender dragon tree Dracophyllum elegantissimum
Totorowhiti Dracophyllum strictum
Variable inaka Dracophyllum trimorphum
Elaeocarpus
Hīnau Elaeocarpus dentatus
Pōkākā Elaeocarpus hookerianus
Griselinia
Akapuka Griselinia lucida
Kapuka Griselinia littoralis
Horopito
Lowland horopito Pseudowintera axillaris
Mountain horopito Pseudowintera colorata
Northland horopito Pseudowintera insperata
Travers horopito Pseudowintera traversii
Kaikōmako Pennantia corymbosa 
Kaka beak Clianthus puniceus
Kawakawa Macropiper excelsum
Kanuka
Geothermal kanuka Kunzea ericoides var. microflora
Great Barrier Island kanuka Kunzea sinclairii
Kanuka Kunzea ericoides var. ericoides
Karaka Corynocarpus laevigatus
Kohekohe Dysoxylum spectabile
Koromiko Veronica salicifolia
Kōtukutuku Fuchsia excorticata
Kōwhai
Coastal kōwhai Sophora chathamica 
Godley's kōwhai Sophora godleyi 
Large-leaved kōwhai Sophora tetraptera 
Limestone kōwhai Sophora longicarinata 
Small-leaved kōwhai Sophora microphylla 
Sophora fulvida
Lacebarks
Lacebark Hoheria populnea
Long-leaved lacebark Hoheria sexstylosa
Mountain lacebark Hoheria glabrata
Mountain lacebark Hoheria lyallii
Narrow-leaved houhere Hoheria angustifolia
Poor Knights houhere Hoheria equitum
Pseudopanax
Five finger Pseudopanax arboreus
Lancewood Pseudopanax crassifolius
Toothed lancewood Pseudopanax ferox
Māhoe
Māhoe Melicytus ramiflorus
Narrow-leaved māhoe Melicytus lanceolatus
Maire Nestegis
Black maire Nestegis cunninghamii
Coastal maire Nestegis apetala
Narrow-leaved maire Nestegis montana
White maire Nestegis lanceolata
Makomako Aristotelia serrata
Mangrove or Mānawa Avicennia marina
Manuka Leptospermum scoparium
Matagouri Discaria toumatou
Matipo
Black matipo, see Pittosporum tenuifolium
Coastal matipo Myrsine aquilonia
Chatham Island matipo Myrsine chathamica
Mt Burnett matipo Myrsine argentea
Red matipo Myrsine australis
Swamp matipo Myrsine coxii
Metrosideros
Bartlett's rātā Metrosideros bartlettii
Kermadec pōhutukawa Metrosideros kermadecensis
Northern rātā Metrosideros robusta
Parkinson's rātā Metrosideros parkinsonii
Pōhutukawa Metrosideros excelsa
Southern rātā Metrosideros umbellata
Milk tree Streblus
Large-leaved milk tree Streblus banksii
Small-leaved milk tree Streblus heterophyllus
Three Kings milk tree Streblus smithii
Nikau Rhopalostylis sapida
Ngaio Myoporum laetum
Olearia (Tree daisy)
Akepiro Olearia furfuracea
Akeake Olearia avicenniifolia
Akiraho Olearia paniculata
Chatham Island akeake Olearia traversiorum
Coastal tree daisy Olearia solandri
Common tree daisy Olearia arborescens
Coromandel tree daisy Olearia townsonii
Fragrant tree daisy Olearia fragrantissima
Gardner's tree daisy Olearia gardneri
Great Barrier tree daisy Olearia allomii
Hector's tree daisy Olearia hectorii
Heketara Olearia rani var. colorata
Heketara Olearia rani var. rani
Keketerehe Olearia chathamica
Lancewood tree daisy Olearia lacunosa
Mountain holly Olearia ilicifolia
Musky tree daisy Olearia moschata
Olearia angulata
Olearia crebra
Olearia lineata
Small-leaved tree daisy Olearia fimbriata
Streamside tree daisy Olearia cheesemanii
Subantarctic tree daisy Olearia lyallii
Swamp akeake Olearia telmatica
Tanguru Olearia albida
Tētēaweka Olearia angustifolia
Ongaonga Urtica ferox
Pigeonwood Hedycarya arborea 
Pittosporum
Black matipo Pittosporum tenuifolium
Fairchild's kohuhu Pittosporum fairchildii
Haekaro Pittosporum umbellatum
Heart-leaved pittosporum Pittosporum obcordatum
Hutton's kohuhu Pittosporum huttonianum
Karo Pittosporum crassifolium
Karo Pittosporum ralphii
Lemonwood Pittosporum eugenioides
Pitpat Pittosporum patulum
Pittosporum ellipticum
Pittosporum virgatum
Turner's kohuhu Pittosporum turneri
Pouteretere Leptecophylla robusta
Puka Meryta sinclairii
Pukatea Laurelia novae-zelandiae
Putaputawētā Carpodetus serratus
Puriri Vitex lucens
Quintinia
Westland quintinia Quintinia acutifolia
Tāwheowheo Quintinia serrata
Ramarama Lophomyrtus bullata
Rautini Brachyglottis huntii
Rewarewa Knightia excelsa
Ribbonwood
Ribbonwood Plagianthus betulinus
Chatham Island ribbonwood Plagianthus regius subsp. chathamicus
Lowland ribbonwood or mānatu Plagianthus regius subsp. regius
Southern beeches Nothofagus
Black beech Nothofagus solandri var. solandri
Hard beech Nothofagus truncata
Mountain beech Nothofagus solandri var. cliffortioides
Red beech Nothofagus fusca
Silver beech Nothofagus menziesii
Swamp maire Syzygium maire
Tāwari Ixerba brexioides
Tawāpou Pouteria costata
Titoki Alectryon excelsus
Toro Myrsine salicina
Weinmannia
Kāmahi Weinmannia racemosa
Tōwai Weinmannia sylvicola
Wharangi Melicope ternata
Whau Entelea arborescens (corkwood)

See also
List of extinct plants of New Zealand

References

External links
 Comprehensive list of botanical and family names

 Trees
New Zealand
Trees